Watergrasshill GAA is a Gaelic Athletic Association club based in the parish of Watergrasshill, County Cork, Ireland. The club is affiliated to Cork GAA and is part of the Imokilly division. Currently, the club fields teams in hurling and camogie, with no Gaelic football teams.

History
The club was founded in 1928. It was predominantly a Junior B hurling club for much of its early existence, winning an East Cork B hurling championship in 1947. It did on occasion sporadically enter teams in the East Cork football championship in its earlier years, with little success.

In 1960 the club became a sister club to the Gaelic football club in the parish, Glenville. Watergrasshill would send its footballers to play for Glenville and in return, Glenville would send its hurlers to play for Watergrasshill.

In 1968 the club won its second East Cork Jr B title and regraded to Junior A for the following season. Within 5 years the club had captured its first East Cork Junior A championship in 1974 and followed it up later that year by winning the Cork County Junior A hurling title beating Charleville in the final 3.08 to 0.10. This was the first county championship ever won in the parish.

Between 1975 and 1981 the club competed in the Cork Intermediate hurling championship and reached the semifinals in 1978. The club regraded in 1982 back to Junior A and competed in and lost East Cork Jr A finals in 1982, 1985 and 1995.

Since the late '70s the club has owned its own facilities in Condonstown Watergrasshill, the facilities are named after prominent club man Felix Sarsfield who did massive work in running the club throughout its early existence, and the venue hosted the 1993 East Cork Junior A hurling final. In the 1990s, considerable effort was put into underage hurling in the parish through both national schools and through a newly formed and well run juvenile hurling club. Many underage titles were won during the'90s and 2000s and the club often competed at the highest grades of juvenile hurling in Cork. This commitment to juvenile hurling was to reap dividends in the new millennium as the club entered its most successful era.

In 2000 the club won its second East Cork Junior A championship and followed this up 3 seasons later with its third East Cork Junior A championship in 2003. The club was promoted back to the intermediate grade for the 2004 season.

The 2004 season was to be the greatest season in the club's history. Complete outsiders at the beginning of the campaign the team surprised many by going on an incredible run and defeating Bandon & Kilbrittin, drawing with Bandon (who had regrouped and availed of the new 2 cd chance system), defeating Bandon in the replay and defeating Nemo Rangers in the county semi-final and setting up a county final date with North Corkmen Dromina. On a wet and windy October Sunday, Watergrasshill were crowned Cork County intermediate hurling champions on a scoreline of 2.13 to 2.08 amid huge celebrations.

The club was promoted to the Premier intermediate hurling championship in 2005 and has played at this high level since. In 2007 the club reached the final of this grade before losing to Carrigtwohill in a classic on a scoreline of 3.14 to 3.12.

Since the early 1970s the club has fielded a second team that usually plays in the East Cork Junior B hurling championship but has on occasion played in the East Cork Junior A championship. This second team has won East Cork Junior B championships in 1997, 1999, 2001 and 2018. The 2018 triumph was followed later in the year by winning the Cork County Junior B hurling championship defeating Mallow in the final by 2.16 to 3.11.

The club continues to thrive and its main aim is to promote hurling in the parish. Plans are underway to purchase and construct new playing facilities while on field the club is continuing its aim of attaining senior hurling status.

Achievements
 Cork Intermediate Hurling Championship Winner (1) 2004
 Cork Junior A Hurling Championship Winner (1) 1974
Cork Junior B Hurling Championship Winner (1) 2018
Cork Premier intermediate Hurling championship Runners up 2007
East Cork Junior A hurling Championship Winners (3) 1974, 2000, 2003 
 East Cork Junior B Hurling Championship Winners (6) 1947, 1968, 1997, 1999, 2001, 2018
 Cork Under-21 B Hurling Championship Winner (1) 2015 
 East Cork Under-21 B Hurling Championship Winners (6) 1976, 1981, 1998, 2005, 2013, 2015
 East Cork Minor A Hurling Championship Winners (2) 2001, 2010

Notable players
Eamon Ryan (Gaelic footballer)
Shane O'Regan
Daire O'Leary

References

External sources
 Club Website
 Imokilly juvenile GAA website
 East Cork GAA board

Gaelic games clubs in County Cork
Hurling clubs in County Cork